Steinibach may refer to several places in Switzerland:

 Steinibach, Glarus
 Steinibach, Obwalden